Wizards is a 1977 American animated post-apocalyptic science fantasy film written, directed and produced by Ralph Bakshi and distributed by 20th Century Fox. The film follows a battle between two wizards of opposing powers, one representing the forces of magic and the other representing the forces of technology.

The film is notable for being the first fantasy film by Bakshi, a filmmaker who was previously known only for "urban films" such as Fritz the Cat, Heavy Traffic and Coonskin. The film grossed 9 million theatrically with a $2 million budget.

Plot 

Earth has been devastated by a nuclear war. It takes 2 million years for the radioactive clouds to allow sunlight in. The humans who survived the apocalypse have been transformed into mutants, while humanity's true ancestors—fairies, elves and dwarves—resurface and live in the idyllic land of Montagar.

While her people celebrate 3,000 years of peace, Delia, queen of the fairies, falls into a trance and gives birth to twin wizards: the kindhearted Avatar and his evil, mutated brother Blackwolf. After Delia's death years later, Blackwolf attempts to usurp her leadership, but Avatar defeats him in a magical duel. Blackwolf leaves Montagar, vowing to return and "make this a planet where mutants rule".

Three thousand years later, Blackwolf leads the dark land of Scortch, where he and his army of mutants and other evil creatures (orcs, goblins, trolls, dragons, etc.), salvage and restore ancient technology. He tries to attack Montagar twice, but is foiled when his mutant warriors become bored or sidetracked in the midst of battle. Blackwolf then discovers an old projector and reels of Nazi propaganda footage from World War II, using his magic to enhance it for psychological warfare: inspiring his own soldiers while horrifying enemy troops into submission.

Meanwhile, in Montagar, Avatar trains the president's daughter, Elinore, to become a full-fledged fairy. Suddenly, the president is assassinated by Necron 99, a robot sent by Blackwolf to kill all believers in magic. Avatar subdues the robot and reconditions it for nonviolence, changing its name to Peace "in the hopes that he will bring it". Avatar learns from the robot that the "dream machine" – the projector – is Blackwolf's secret weapon. Avatar, Elinore, Peace, and the elf warrior Weehawk set out to destroy the projector and save the world from another Holocaust.

In a forest inhabited by fairies, the group is accosted by their leader, Sean. Weehawk realizes that Peace is missing, when an unseen assassin kills Sean and kidnaps Elinore. Avatar and Weehawk begin to search for Elinore in the forbidden Fairy Sanctuary, but Weehawk falls into a chasm and insists that Avatar leave him and find the girl. Avatar locates her, captured by fairies and small human-like creatures, just as she is about to be killed. Avatar attempts to explain that they did not kill Sean, but the fairies do not believe him and shoot him with an arrow. Wounded in the shoulder, Avatar refuses to fight back, which impresses the fairy king. Instead of executing them, he merely teleports Avatar and Elinore to a snowy mountaintop. Avatar and Elinore resume their journey, but they soon realize that they are wandering in circles. Peace and Weehawk (whom Peace saved from a vicious monster in the chasm) find Avatar and Elinore. Together, they find their way out of the mountains. Soon, Avatar and the others encounter the encamped army of an elf General who is preparing to attack Scortch the following day, but Blackwolf launches a sneak attack that night.

Elinore and Peace are attacked by one of Blackwolf's demons which Avatar quickly dispatches. When one of Blackwolf's battle tanks arrives to destroy the camp, Elinore unexpectedly kills Peace and climbs into the tank as it drives off.

The next day, Avatar and Weehawk enter Scortch by ship and make for Blackwolf's castle, while the General leads his elf warriors in a bloody battle to distract Blackwolf's forces. The pair split up, Weehawk tracking Elinore while Avatar goes after Blackwolf. Weehawk nearly kills Elinore, but she explains that Blackwolf had taken control of her mind after she touched Peace. Blackwolf declares his magic superior to Avatar's and demands his surrender. Avatar admits that he has not practiced magic for some time, but offers to show Blackwolf a trick that their mother taught him; Avatar then pulls a pistol from his sleeve and shoots Blackwolf dead. Weehawk destroys the projector, leaving the mutants leaderless and helpless as the General's army defeats them. With Montagar's safety secured, Weehawk returns home as its new ruler, while Avatar and Elinore decide to start their own kingdom elsewhere.

Cast 
 Bob Holt as Avatar, an old but powerful wizard.
 Jesse Welles as Elinore, a fiery fairy and Avatar's love interest.
 Richard Romanus as Weehawk, an elf warrior.
 David Proval as Necron 99/Peace, Blackwolf's former minion. He is renamed Peace by Avatar.
 Steve Gravers as Blackwolf, Avatar's evil twin brother and main antagonist of the film.
 James Connell as President, the leader and Elinore’s father.
 Mark Hamill as Sean, son of the king of the mountain fairies and captain of the guards. This is his film debut, made at around the same time that George Lucas cast him in Star Wars as Luke Skywalker.
 Susan Tyrrell as The Narrator (uncredited).
 Ralph Bakshi as Fritz/Lardbottom/Stormtrooper (uncredited).
 Angelo Grisanti as Larry the Lizard (uncredited).

Production 

Ralph Bakshi had long had an interest in fantasy, and had been drawing fantasy artwork as far back as 1955, while he was still in high school. Wizards originated in the concept for Tee-Witt, an unproduced television series Bakshi developed and pitched to CBS in 1967. In 1976, Bakshi pitched War Wizards, which he wrote in only two weeks, to 20th Century Fox. Returning to the fantasy drawings he had created in high school for inspiration, Bakshi intended to prove that he could produce a "family picture" that had the same impact as his adult-oriented films.

The film is an allegorical comment on the moral ambiguity of technology and the potentially destructive powers of propaganda. Blackwolf's secret weapon is propaganda, used to incite his legions and terrorize the fairy folk of Montagar; but Avatar's willingness to use a technological tool (a handgun pulled from "up his sleeve") destroys his evil twin. Bakshi also states that Wizards "was about the creation of the state of Israel and the Holocaust, about the Jews looking for a homeland, and about the fact that fascism was on the rise again".

British illustrator Ian Miller and comic book artist Mike Ploog were hired to contribute backgrounds and designs. The crew included Vita, Turek, Sparey, Vitello and Spence, who had become comfortable with Bakshi's limited storyboarding and lack of pencil tests. Artist Alex Niño signed a contract with Bakshi to work on the film, and was granted a work visa, but was unable to gain permission from the Philippine government to leave for the United States until two months afterward, and later found that by the time he had arrived in the United States, not only had the film's animation been completed, but Niño's visa did not allow him to submit freelance work on any other projects.

The film's main cast includes Bob Holt, Jesse Welles, Richard Romanus, David Proval, and Steve Gravers. Bakshi cast Holt based on his ability to imitate the voice of actor Peter Falk, of whom Bakshi is a fan. Welles, Romanus and Proval again worked with Bakshi on Hey Good Lookin', where Romanus and Proval provided the voices of Vinnie and Crazy Shapiro, respectively. Actress Tina Bowman, who plays a small role in Wizards, has a larger role in Hey Good Lookin'. Actor Mark Hamill auditioned for and received a voice role in the film. Bakshi states that "He needed a job, and he came to me, and I thought he was great, and [George] Lucas thought he should do it, and he got not only Wizards, he got Star Wars." Bakshi had wanted a female narrator for his film, and he loved Susan Tyrrell's acting. Tyrrell performed the narration for the film, but Bakshi was told that he couldn't credit her for her narration. Years later, Tyrrell told Bakshi that she got most of her later work from her narration on the film, and that she wished she had allowed him to put her name on it.

John Grant writes in his book Masters of Animation that "[the] overall affect [sic] of the animation is akin to that of the great anime creators – one has to keep reminding oneself that Wizards predates Miyazaki's The Castle of Cagliostro (1979), not the other way round. [...] The backgrounds [...] are especially lovely, even the simplest of them; and in general the movie has a strong visual brio despite occasional technical hurriedness." Notable artists involved in the production of Wizards include Ian Miller, who produced the gloomy backgrounds of Scortch, and Mike Ploog, who contributed likewise for the more arcadian landscapes of Montagar.

Bakshi was unable to complete the battle sequences with the budget Fox had given him. When he asked them for a budget increase, they refused (during the same meeting, director George Lucas had asked for a budget increase for Star Wars and was also refused). As a result, Bakshi finished his film by paying out of his own pocket and using rotoscoping for the unfinished battle sequences. According to Bakshi, "I thought that if we dropped all the detail, it would look very artistic, and very beautiful, and I felt, why bother animating all of this? I'm looking for a way to get realism into my film and get real emotion." In his audio commentary for the film's DVD release, Bakshi states that "There's no question that it was an easier way to get these gigantic scenes that I wanted. It also was the way that showed me how to do Lord of the Rings, so it worked two ways." In addition to stock footage, the film used battle sequences from films such as Zulu, El Cid, Battle of the Bulge and Alexander Nevsky for rotoscoping. Live-action sequences from Patton were also featured.

Vaughn Bode's work has been credited as an influence on Wizards. Quentin Tarantino describes Avatar as "a cross between Tolkien's Hobbit, Mel Brooks' 2000 Year Old Man, and Marvel Comics' Howard the Duck" and Blackwolf as physically similar to Sergei Eisenstein's Ivan the Terrible. In Jerry Beck's Animated Movie Guide, Andrew Leal writes that "The central figure, Avatar [...] sounds a great deal like Peter Falk, and clearly owes much to cartoonist Vaughn Bodé's Cheech Wizard character."

As War Wizards neared completion, Lucas requested that Bakshi change the title of his film to Wizards in order to avoid conflict with Star Wars, and Bakshi agreed because Lucas had allowed Mark Hamill to take time off from Star Wars in order to record a voice for Wizards.

Response and legacy 
Although Wizards received a limited release, it was very successful in the theaters that showed it, and developed a worldwide audience. According to Bakshi, he was once interviewed by a German reporter who was unsure as to why the Nazi Swastika was used to represent war. Bakshi said "I didn't get any criticism. People pretty much loved Wizards." Review aggregator website Rotten Tomatoes gives the film an approval rating of 62%, based on 29 reviews with an average rating of 5.5/10. The website's critical consensus reads, "Its central metaphor is a bit too on the nose, but Wizards is an otherwise psychedelic, freaky trip into an alternate version of our world."

A. H. Weiler of The New York Times writes that the film "evolves, at best, as only a mildly interesting mixture of clashing polemics and shoot-'em-up melodrama" that "merely restates the already too obvious, dire results of nuclear war and man's inhumanity to man." Arthur D. Murphy of Variety panned the film as "a confusing melange of melodrama, allegory and limp polemic. The animation technique is excellent in a professional sense, but neither story nor music ever really gets interesting." Gene Siskel gave the film two-and-a-half stars out of four and wrote that "Ralph Bakshi's 'Wizards,' although good-looking, isn't magical enough. Although it's a futuristic fairy-tale, it frequently interrupts its narrative with contemporary jokes. The jokes remind us we're watching a movie while calling into question the sincerity of the film itself." Charles Champlin of the Los Angeles Times was generally positive, writing: "Whatever else it is, 'Wizards' is a feast for the eyes, a nonstop succession of imaginings and imageries that are beautiful, startling funny, powerfully ominous, classically cartoonish, visions of heaven and hellfire ... It is hypnotically interesting for those who are addicted to animation but hardly less so to those who are plenty satisfied with Tom and Jerry." Gary Arnold of The Washington Post found the film a "dim animated novelty" that was "conspicuously lacking in narrative momentum. Even when the graphics and draughtsmanship seem clever, they embellish the most negligible of scenarios." Richard Combs of The Monthly Film Bulletin wrote, "What emerges from this mish-mash of material is a predictable confusion of sentiment and cynicism: Bakshi seems uncertain whether to try for the full other-worldly magic of Tolkien or to treat the whole thing as camp (the tone of the flower-child fairy-tale narrator strongly suggests the latter)."

Audio clips from the film have been sampled by Toxik on the album Think This, Cypress Hill on the albums IV and Skull & Bones, Vanilla Ice on Platinum Underground and 65daysofstatic on the album Volume 1: Then We Take Japan.

20th Century Fox Home Entertainment responded to an online petition created by Animation on DVD.com and written by Keith Finch demanding the film's release on DVD. The disc, released on May 25, 2004, featured an audio commentary track by Bakshi and the interview segment Ralph Bakshi: The Wizard of Animation. Bakshi has stated that Wizards was always intended as a trilogy. One of the sequels was pitched to Fox, who have yet to greenlight the project.

20th Century Fox released a Special Edition Blu-ray Disc of the film on March 13, 2012, to commemorate the film's 35th anniversary. The disc includes the special features from the DVD, along with a 24-page book including rare artwork from the film and an introduction from Bakshi.

Possible sequel 
Bakshi mentioned he had plans for a sequel entitled Wizards 2 that involved the relationship between Avatar and Elinore. Bakshi said the plot would be "where [their relationship] doesn't work out, and Weehawk gets in the way." The sequel was never developed due to production difficulties and the other projects on which Bakshi was then focused.

In late 2004, a Wizards II graphic novel went into production, produced by Bakshi. The stories will be from the Wizards "universe" and each story will be created by a different artist. In September 2008, it was announced that Main Street Pictures would collaborate with Bakshi on a sequel to Wizards.

As of 2015, Bakshi has stated that he has a script finished and hopes to have it be his next film. In a November interview, while promoting Last Days of Coney Island, Bakshi stated that Wizards 2 is about "madness, absolute madness!"

See also 
 List of 20th Century Fox theatrical animated features
 Sword and planet
 Sword and sorcery

References

External links 

 
 
 
 
 
 
 Wizards  at the official Ralph Bakshi website.

1977 films
1977 animated films
1970s American animated films
1970s fantasy films
1970s science fiction adventure films
American adult animated films
20th Century Fox animated films
20th Century Fox films
American animated science fantasy films
American animated science fiction films
American fantasy adventure films
American robot films
American satirical films
Animated films about robots
Animated post-apocalyptic films
1970s English-language films
Fantasy war films
Films about elves
Films about fairies and sprites
Films about fear
Films about wizards
Films directed by Ralph Bakshi
Films produced by Ralph Bakshi
Films set in the future
Films with screenplays by Ralph Bakshi
Fratricide in fiction
Rotoscoped films
Sword and sorcery films